= Flickering spectroscopy =

Flickering analysis of cellular or membranous structures is a widespread technique for measuring the bending modulus and other properties from the power spectrum of thermal fluctuations.

First demonstrated theoretically by Brochard and Lennon in 1975, flickering spectroscopy has become a widespread technique due to its simplicity and lack of specialised equipment beyond a brightfield microscope. It is used in structures such as red blood cells, giant unilamellar vesicles and other cell-like structures.

== Theoretical overview ==
Considering a quasi-spherical shell subject to thermal undulations according to Langevin dynamics, one can express the time-averaged mean square amplitudes of the fluctuation modes as

$\biggl\langle | u_n^m |^2 \biggr\rangle = \frac{k_B T}{\kappa (n-1) (n+2) [n(n+1) + \overline{\sigma}]}$

where $n$ and $m$ index the fluctuation mode corresponding to spherical harmonics $Y^m_n(\theta,\phi)$ and $\overline{\sigma} = \sigma(R^2/\kappa)-2H_0 R + 2H_0^2 R^2$ is the reduced membrane tension, $H_0$ is the spontaneous curvature and $\kappa$ is the bending modulus, as defined by the Helfrich hamiltonian.

== Experimental procedure and analysis ==
The equatorial plane of a cell-like structure can be imaged using phase contrast microscopy to obtain a video showing the fluctuations of the membrane.

On the video, the contours can be found using image analysis algorithms, which can then be used to determine the power spectrum of the fluctuation modes in real space amplitude. This can be used, following the steps above, to obtain relevant parameters such as the bending modulus, which is useful for a number of applications in membrane structure research.
